The Eastern Group is one of the island groups of the Azores, Portugal. It comprises the islands of São Miguel and Santa Maria and the Formigas Islets.

References 

 
Islands of Macaronesia
Geography of Southwestern Europe